Radio City was a luxurious and modern cinema that opened on 18 September 1958 in Tehran.

Radio City was designed by Heydar Ghiai, a pioneer of modern architecture in Iran. The cinema was shut down after the 1979 Iranian Islamic revolution.

References

Fires in Iran
Buildings and structures in Tehran
Former cinemas in Iran
Buildings and structures completed in 1958
Heydar Ghiai buildings and structures